Peckoltia ephippiata is a species of catfish in the family Loricariidae. It is a freshwater fish native to South America, where it is known from the Leitão River, which is part of the Madeira River drainage in the state of Rôndonia in Brazil. The species reaches 10.2 cm (4 inches) SL.

Its specific epithet, ephippiata, derives from the Latin word for "saddle" and refers to the saddle-like patterns exhibited by the species. It was described in 2015 by Jonathan W. Armbruster (of Auburn University), David C. Werneke, and Milton Tan alongside two other "saddled" members of the genus Peckoltia: P. greedoi and P. lujani.

References 

Loricariidae
Fish described in 2015
Fish of Brazil